Essop Goolam Pahad (born 21 June 1939) is a retired South African politician. He served as the Minister in the Presidency from 1999 to 2008.

Early life
Pahad was born in Schweizer-Reneke in the former Transvaal Province. He is an alumnus of both the University of the Witwatersrand (Wits) and the University of Sussex. He started his academic career with a Bachelor of Arts degree in political science at Wits. At the University of Sussex, he completed a Master of Arts in African politics as well as his PhD in history. The title of his thesis was "The Development of Indian Political Movements in South Africa 1924 – 1946." He is the brother of Aziz Pahad.

Political career
His political career began in 1958 when he became a member of the Transvaal Indian Youth Congress. In 1962 Pahad was arrested for organising an illegal strike, following the banning of the African National Congress. In December 1964, Pahad was banned for five years and went into exile. While in exile, Pahad became more actively involved with the ANC and the SACP. He represented the SACP on the editorial council for the World Marxist Review.

Career in government
After the 1994 South African general election, Pahad served as the Parliamentary Counsellor to then-Deputy President Thabo Mbeki. He was appointed as the Minister in the Presidency after the 1999 general election. In 2000 it was reported that at a closed session of the ANC's governance committee Pahad tried to squash an inquiry into corruption in the Arms Deal, an accusation that Pahad denies despite numerous reports to the contrary.

Pahad was also involved in raising R1.55 million from corporate sponsors to hire Ronald Suresh Roberts to write a biography of then President Mbeki.

After Mbeki's resignation as President of South Africa in September 2008, Pahad submitted his resignation as Minister.

Post-2008
Pahad was a member of the Organising Committee of the 2010 FIFA World Cup held in South Africa, and claimed in 2008 that South African whites wanted the event to be a failure. An independent survey by Human Sciences Research Council (HSRC) reported in January 2010 that South African whites in fact generally support the event.

Pahad was the chairman of the board of the South Africa/Mali Timbuktu Manuscripts Trust as well as chairman of the board of trustees of the South African Democracy Education Trust, and a former member of the national executive committee of the African National Congress. After leaving government in 2008 Pahad launched a South African monthly (later quarterly) journal named The Thinker, which was later taken over by the University of Johannesburg in 2019.

References

1939 births
Living people
People from Schweizer-Reneke
South African politicians of Indian descent
South African Communist Party politicians
African National Congress politicians
Government ministers of South Africa
Members of the National Assembly of South Africa
Anti-apartheid activists
South African Muslims
Recipients of Pravasi Bharatiya Samman